Kenneth Bain (22 June 1882 – 26 October 1942) was a New Zealand cricketer. He played in three first-class matches for Canterbury in 1906/07.

See also
 List of Canterbury representative cricketers

References

External links
 

1882 births
1942 deaths
New Zealand cricketers
Canterbury cricketers
Cricketers from Dunedin